Volodymyr Bayenko (born 9 February 1990) is a former professional Ukrainian football defender.

Career
Bayenko is a product of the FC Shakhtar and FC Olimpik Youth Sportive School Systems in Donetsk. He spent time in the different Ukrainian Second League and Ukrainian First League clubs, but in summer 2016 signed a contract with FC Zirka in the Ukrainian Premier League.

Honours
Levadia Tallinn
 Meistriliiga: 2021

Riga
 Latvian Higher League: 2018 
 Latvian Football Cup: 2018

Zirka Kropyvnytsky
 Ukrainian First League:2016

Vorskla Poltava
 Ukrainian Cup: Runners-up 2019–20

References

External links
 
 

1990 births
Living people
People from Komsomolske, Donetsk Oblast
Ukrainian footballers
Association football defenders
FC Makiyivvuhillya Makiyivka players
FC Hirnyk Kryvyi Rih players
FC Zirka Kropyvnytskyi players
Ukrainian Premier League players
Uzbekistan Super League players
Ukrainian expatriate footballers
Expatriate footballers in Uzbekistan
Ukrainian expatriate sportspeople in Uzbekistan
Buxoro FK players
Expatriate footballers in Latvia
Riga FC players
Ukrainian expatriate sportspeople in Latvia
FC Vorskla Poltava players
FCI Levadia Tallinn players
Expatriate footballers in Estonia
Ukrainian expatriate sportspeople in Estonia
Sportspeople from Donetsk Oblast
Meistriliiga players